Kent Craig "Skeets" Lambert (February 27, 1891 – December 13, 1982) was an American football player and a college football and college basketball coach. He served as the head football coach (1913–1914) and basketball coach (1913–1915) at Ripon College in Ripon, Wisconsin.

Lambert was a graduate of Wabash College in Crawfordsville, Indiana, where he starred as a member of the football team. He was also a member of the basketball, baseball, and track teams at Wabash. Lambert played professionally for several teams in the Ohio League during the 1915 and 1916 seasons.

Head coaching record

Football

References

External links
 

1891 births
1982 deaths
American football quarterbacks
Canton Bulldogs players
Detroit Heralds players
Fort Wayne Friars players
Massillon Tigers  players
Ripon Red Hawks athletic directors
Ripon Red Hawks football coaches
Ripon Red Hawks men's basketball coaches
Wabash Little Giants baseball players
Wabash Little Giants basketball players
Wabash Little Giants football players
College men's track and field athletes in the United States
People from Deadwood, South Dakota
Coaches of American football from South Dakota
Players of American football from South Dakota
Basketball players from South Dakota
Basketball coaches from South Dakota
Track and field athletes from South Dakota